The MacDiarmid Institute for Advanced Materials and Nanotechnology (often simply called the MacDiarmid Institute) is a New Zealand Centre of Research Excellence (CoRE) specialising in materials science and nanotechnology. It is hosted by Victoria University of Wellington, and is a collaboration between five universities and two Crown Research Institutes.

Background

The Institute is named after Alan MacDiarmid, a New Zealander who won the Nobel Prize in Chemistry in 2000. It is funded by the New Zealand government through the Tertiary Education Commission.

The Institute divides its work into four research areas:
Towards Zero Waste - Reconfigurable Systems
Towards Zero Carbon - Catalytic Architectures
Towards Low Energy Tech - Hardware for Future Computing
Sustainable resource use - Mātauranga Māori Research Programme

Awards 
From 2004 to 2007, the MacDiarmid Institute sponsored the annual Young Scientist of the Year awards for up-and-coming scientists and researchers in New Zealand, organised by the Foundation for Research, Science and Technology.  These awards replaced the FiRST Scholarship Awards, and have subsequently been replaced by the Prime Minister's MacDiarmid Emerging Scientist Prize.

Directors

See also
 Cather Simpson
Alison Downard

References

External links
MacDiarmid Institute website
MacDiarmid Institute's BioNanotechnology network

Research institutes in New Zealand
Victoria University of Wellington
Nanotechnology institutions
2002 establishments in New Zealand
New Zealand awards
Science and technology in New Zealand